Beau Jack (born Sidney Walker; April 1, 1921 – February 9, 2000) was an American lightweight boxer and two-time world lightweight champion in the 1940s. One of the most popular fighters during the War Years, he headlined at Madison Square Garden on twenty one occasions, a record that still stands.

Early years
Sidney Walker was born in Waynesboro, Georgia on April 1, 1921. After the death of his mother he moved to Augusta, and stayed with his grandmother, Evie Mixom, who affectionately called him "Beau Jack". He grew up during the Depression on a ragged farm where he worked the fields, and in the evening would work as a shoe-shine boy. A few days a week he would arise early, walk three miles into town and shine shoes till dusk. To make extra money, he would engage in battle royales, which consisted of five to ten boys, usually Black, fighting each other, often blindfolded, until only one remained standing. The winner was given a purse by the white organizers.

Following his first battle royale at the Augusta National Golf Club, Jack accepted a position as a caddie there. He quickly befriended some of the club's members, including golfing legend Bobby Jones, who helped fund his boxing training.

Boxing career
Jack turned professional in 1940, and began his career fighting in Massachusetts where he established an impressive record of 27-4-2. During this period, he earned his reputation as a relentless and powerful fighter, essential traits that endeared him to his fans and won over admirers.

First taking the NYSAC World Lightweight Championship, December 1942
He moved to New York City in August 1941, where he continued to impress under the management of Chick Wergeles. In November 1942, he found himself in a fight against Allie Stolz at Madison Square Garden to determine who would challenge for the New York version of the world lightweight title.

Going into the fight, Stolz was the clear favorite, with 3-1 odds. Before an enthusiastic crowd, Jack staged an upset, winning the match with a technical knockout of Stolz in the seventh round. Stoltz had cuts on his left eyelid and eyebrow that led the referee to end the bout.

In his first NYSAC Lightweight Title bout against Tippy Larkin on December 18, 1942, Jack surprised again by knocking out the champion in the third round with a right uppercut to the chin. He floored Larkin with a left hook for a count of one in the first minute of the first round. The bout was furious and both boxers landed constant blows, though Jack seemed to withstand the onslaught of Larkin and deliver an equal or greater number of counterpunches. Larkin was carried to his corner from a blow by Jack, 1:19 into the third, that rendered him unconscious for the ten count. It was only the third KO of Larkin's career. Both boxers were within a pound of 133.

Victories over Fritzie Zivic, February – March 1943
Jack twice defeated Fritzie Zivic at Madison Square Garden on February 5, and March 5, 1943, in ten and twelve round unanimous decisions, though their second meeting was rather close. One source wrote Zivic was known for "dirty tactics", and that he fought like "a back ally brawler."

The crowd of more than 20,000 in the Garden on February 5, were displeased when Jack was called for a low blow in the eighth round, and the point's scoring became closer when Jack lost the round as a result of the foul. Nonetheless, the referee and judges gave the bout to Jack by at least a two-round margin.

Losing the NYSAC World Lightweight Championship to Bob Montgomery, May 1943
Jack held the World Lightweight Title for only six months before dropping it to fellow hall-of-famer Bob Montgomery on May 21, 1943, before 18,343 in a fifteen-round unanimous points decision at the Garden. Jack won the first round by a wide margin with a flurry of uppercuts and his signature free-wheeling, constant punching from many angles.  But Montgomery quickly settled down and scored frequently with a strong straight right that at times had Jack close to a knockout and against which he could find no adequate defense. Jack's eyes were virtually closed during much of the bout, but Montgomery's injuries were restricted to a cut above one eye. A right to the chin briefly knocked Jack to his knees in the eleventh round and he struggled in the remaining rounds. One ringside reporter gave Montgomery eleven rounds to only four for Jack.

Regaining the World Lightweight Championship from Montgomery, November 1943
Jack would go on to regain the title from Montgomery on November 19, 1943, in a fifteen-round unanimous decision at New York's Madison Square Garden before a crowd of 17,866. Beau carefully followed the advice of his trainer Larry Amadee, who told him to stay close to Montgomery, fight fiercely when separated from clinches, and generally use his strength in infighting. He coasted on the advice of Amadee in several rounds. He stayed with Amadee's advice when Montgomery finished strong in the last five rounds. The Associated Press gave Jack seven rounds, six to Montgomery, and two even, though both judges gave Jack an impressive ten rounds.

In the ninth round, Jack scored one of his strongest blows after coming out of a clinch, and it helped him to take the offensive and win the ninth and tenth rounds. In the final five and particularly the last two rounds, Montgomery seemed strongest, nearly taking the bout in the opinion of some ringside. Jack was battered and required great conditioning and willpower to hold on through the final rounds.

Jack met Sammy Angott in a non-title match on January 28, 1944, drawing in ten rounds at Madison Square Garden before an impressive crowd of 19,113, the largest of the year. The match was an important contest between Jack, the New York State World Lightweight Champion, and Angott, the National Boxing Association World Lightweight Champion. Who led the battle see-sawed from boxer to boxer so frequently, it was a difficult contest to score. There were no knockdowns in the bout. The United Press gave each boxer four rounds with two even.

Angott had a problem from a thigh injury he had received in training and was limping as he was led from the ring at the end of the bout.

Jack finally lost the Lightweight Championship for the second time to Montgomery on March 3, 1944, in a fifteen-round split decision before 19,066 fans in Madison Square Garden. Jack had led in the early betting. The fighting was fierce and close throughout and Montgomery was given no more than a two-round advantage by the judges or referee, though the Associated Press scored the bout 8 for Montgomery, 4 for Jack, and three even. It would be Jack's last lightweight title match until meeting Ike Williams in July 1948.

On March 17, 1944, he defeated Al "Bummy" Davis, the "Brooklyn Bomber", at Madison Square Garden before a crowd of nearly 20,000, in a ten-round unanimous decision. The referees and judges gave him no less than nine of the rounds, with two scoring all ten rounds for Jack. Jack, who was a slight favorite in the betting, brought crowds to the Garden in 1943–44. The Georgia boot-black got out of his crouching style and slugged it out in close quarters with Davis in several rounds.

Win over NBA Lightweight Champion Juan Zurita, March 31, 1944
On March 31, 1944, Jack defeated Mexican-born boxer Juan Zurita in a ten-round points decision at New York's Madison Square Garden. Zurita had taken the NBA Lightweight Title only three weeks earlier from Sammy Angott in Los Angeles. Zurita faded after the fifth round, and was given only three rounds to seven for Jack by the United Press. The Mexican champion looked strong in the tenth, and took the round. The capacity crowd of 17,593 were hoping for more action in the early rounds, but both boxers, knowing the skills of their opponent fought cautiously.

War bonds fight with Bob Montgomery, August 1944
Some consider the most famous fight of Jack's career, a bout with Montgomery on August 4, 1944. Staged at a critical time in the second World War, it became known as  the "War Bonds Fight", and tickets were only made available to purchasers of war bonds. A ringside seat required purchase of a $100,000 war bond.

Although Montgomery's title was not on the line, the gate was a record $36 million with 15,822 war bonds being sold. Many people who purchased bonds charitably left their tickets at the box office to be used by American servicemen. Montgomery and Jack, who were both serving as privates in the US Army, refused to take purses for the fight. Jack took the fight on points after 10 rounds, however the highlight of the evening was when the lights dimmed and a spotlight shone on Joe Louis was standing in the front row. Louis was received with a standing ovation.

Jack met Sammy Angott for the second time on July 8, 1946, at Griffith Stadium in Washington, D.C., where a crowd of 10,353 saw Jack win in a seventh-round technical knockout. Angott was very briefly down in round two, and Jack was down twice briefly in round four. The fighting was close but Jack rallied strongly in rounds five and six, and Angott did not answer the opening bell in round seven. The fighters boxed "as if the world championship was at stake". It was a "wild" and "reckless" fight and injuries suffered by Angott to his hip and back were briefly investigated at the request of the D.C. Boxing Commission after the fight. X-rays determined the aging thirty-one year old Angott had chipped a rib and suffered a torn ligament in his foot.

Last shot at the World Lightweight Title, Ike Williams, July 1948
Jack would not challenge for the title again until July 12, 1948, when he fought hall-of-famer and reigning champion Ike Williams in a sixth-round TKO at Shibe Park in Philadelphia. The fighting was fairly close in the first three rounds, as the referee gave one round to each fighter, and declared one even. The fourth was fought cautiously but by the fifth, Williams penetrated Beau's defenses and connected repeatedly. Williams brutally ended the bout with a left hook and flurry of subsequent blows in the sixth which led the referee to end the bout.

Williams was managed and on occasion financially exploited by boxing promoter Frank "Blinky" Palermo, who was Mafia-connected and a partner of Murder Inc. button-man Frankie Carbo. Carbo operated a stable of fighters which would later include heavyweight champion Sonny Liston. The first bout marked the start of a rivalry between Williams and Jack who would go on to fight on three more occasions. With Jack's skills clearly waning, Williams took the first match by a split decision, tied in the second match with a draw, and won the third when his opponent Jack was unable to answer the ninth round bell. Their third fight, on August 12, 1958, in Augusta, Georgia, though memorable, marked the end of Jack's career.

Life after boxing
He retired with a record of 83 wins, with 40 knockouts, 24 losses and five draws. After retirement, he ran a drive-in barbecue stand and operated a small farm in Augusta, Georgia. He refereed wrestling matches in South Carolina during the period. With his boxing earnings, he moved to Miami and returned to shoe shining, working at Miami Beach's Fontainebleau Hotel. He trained fighters in Miami's Fifth Street Gym.

Family
Beau Jack had seven children, Ronald, Donald, George, Barbara Ann, Yvonne, Georgiana and Timothy. His wife was named Josephine. None of the sons became boxers.

Last years and death
In his later years he suffered from poverty and Parkinson's disease. He died at 78, in a Miami nursing home, on February 9, 2000, of complications from Parkinson's disease.

Honors
Jack was inducted into the Georgia Sports Hall of Fame in 1979, and the International Boxing Hall of Fame in 1991.

Professional boxing record

References

External links

Georgia Sports Hall of Fame
Beau Jack

1921 births
2000 deaths
Lightweight boxers
World lightweight boxing champions
World boxing champions
African-American boxers
Sportspeople from Augusta, Georgia
International Boxing Hall of Fame inductees
American male boxers
Boxers from Georgia (U.S. state)
Deaths from Parkinson's disease
Neurological disease deaths in Florida
United States Army personnel of World War II
United States Army soldiers
African Americans in World War II
African-American United States Army personnel